South Mount Hawkins is located in the San Gabriel Mountains, and contained within the Angeles National Forest. The mountain was named after Nellie Hawkins, a popular waitress of the Squirrel Inn located on the North Fork of the San Gabriel River.
Although the Squirrel Inn is long gone, Nellie has her name on Mount Hawkins and South Mount Hawkins.  There are two ridge bumps between the two named summits and they are unofficially known as "Middle Hawkins" and "Sadie Hawkins".

South Mount Hawkins fire lookout tower 
For 67 years the South Mount Hawkins Lookout, tower stood on the summit of South Mount Hawkins It was built in 1935.
It was one of the only all-wooden towers in Southern California. The tower was destroyed in the Curve Fire on September 1, 2002.

Road to tower platform 

The Forest Service has abandoned
located within the Crystal Lake Recreation Area all the way to the concrete platform upon which the fire watch tower used to stand.

The road is only maintained on an as needed basis such as a fire or access to the forest service repeater. Hikers and bicycle riders still find the road passable to the top of South Mount Hawkins however there are washouts along the way and it is strewn with rocks and boulders, making the Deer Flat route up to the mountain difficult. The other access route for hikers but not bicycle riders to reach South Mount Hawkins is the Pacific Crest Trail segment which leads from Windy Gap Trail then down the Hawkins Ridge Trail to the peak.

References 

Landmarks in Los Angeles
San Gabriel Mountains
Mountains of Los Angeles County, California
Mountains of Southern California